Art Pepper Today is a 1978 jazz album by saxophonist Art Pepper playing with Stanley Cowell, Cecil McBee, Roy Haynes and Kenneth Nash.

Reception 

AllMusic reviewer Scott Yanow awarded the album 4 stars and said that "Art Pepper, in the midst of a successful comeback, recorded this excellent set for Galaxy," which includes "a definitive version of his intense ballad 'Patricia.

Track listing 
"Miss Who" (Art Pepper) – 4:42
"Mambo Koyama" (Art Pepper) – 6:40
"Lover Come Back To Me" (Sigmund Romberg; Oscar Hammerstein II) – 6:51
"Patricia" (Art Pepper) – 10:24
"These Foolish Things (Remind Me Of You)" (Harry Link; Jack Strachey; Holt Marvell) – 5:44
"Chris's Blues" (Art Pepper) – 3:50
(Recorded on 1 December & 2 December 1978.)

Personnel 
 Art Pepper – alto saxophone
 Stanley Cowell – piano
 Cecil McBee – bass
 Roy Haynes – drums
 Kenneth Nash – congas & percussion on "Mambo Koyama"

Other tracks recorded at the same sessions but unissued at the time:
1 December 1978
"I Love You" (Cole Porter) – 4:35
Untitled Original (a.k.a. "Pepper Pot") (Art Pepper) – 6:40
"Lover Come Back To Me" (Sigmund Romberg; Oscar Hammerstein II) alternate version – 0:00
2 December 1978
"Yardbird Suite" (Charlie Parker) – 5:18
"Over The Rainbow" (Harold Arlen; E.Y. Harburg) – 8:50
"These Foolish Things (Remind Me Of You)" (Harry Link; Jack Strachey; Holt Marvell) alternate  version – 5:54
"Over The Rainbow" (Harold Arlen; E.Y. Harburg) alternate version – 9:09

Sources 
 Richard Cook & Brian Morton. The Penguin Guide to Jazz on CD. Penguin,  4th edition, 1998.

References 

1979 albums
Art Pepper albums
Galaxy Records albums